Matt Grabe (born 1985 in Phoenix, AZ) is a record producer based out of Los Angeles, California. Matt studied audio engineering at The Conservatory of Recording Arts and Sciences. Upon finishing his studies, he became a member (guitar/piano) of Equal Vision Records artist Alive In Wild Paint. He now is in the studio full-time recording artists and composing television commercials.

Matt has produced records for William Beckett, This Providence, Katelyn Tarver, The Maine, A Rocket To The Moon, The Summer Set, Rocky Loves Emily as well as composed for Coca-Cola, Google, MINI and more.

Selected Discography

References
[ Industry Profile on AllMusic.com]
Industry Profile on AlbumCredits.com
Interview featuring The Summer Set on AlterThePress.com
Articles on AbsolutePunk.net featuring Matt Grabe
Alive in Wild Paint on EqualVisionRecords.com
Matt Grabe credited to Meg & Dia on BandCamp.com

Notes

External links

Matt Grabe on FaceBook.com

Living people
1985 births